The Croatian Bloc or the Croatian National Representation was the name held by the wide coalition of Croatian political parties in the Kingdom of Serbs, Croats, and Slovenes from 1921 to 1929's 6th of January Dictatorship and within the Kingdom of Yugoslavia from 1935 to 1941.

The first Croatian Bloc was formed on January 14, 1922 when the Croatian Republican Peasant Party, the Croatian Community, and the Croatian Party of Rights went into alliance.

The "Representation" was organized for the first time on June 26, 1921. They adopted a resolution supporting federalism and a neutral peasant republic. They also voiced their disapproval towards a centralized constitution, which the National Assembly adopted without them (as well as without the communists and others) only two days later.

The alliance existed until November 1922 when the Party of Rights was ejected from it.

The parties did not participate in a joint list in the 1925 Kingdom of Serbs, Croats and Slovenes parliamentary election. In 1925, the Croatian Peasant Republican Union and the Croatian Party of Rights formed a formal alliance. In 1927, the Croatian Federalist Peasant Party joined this coalition.

In the 1927 elections, the bloc participated with its own list. It had two of its candidates elected as national representatives: Ante Trumbić, the president of the Croatian Federalist Peasant Party that had won the greatest number of seats; and Ante Pavelić of the Croatian Party of Rights.

The Representation often met outside of the National Assembly, either in Belgrade or Zagreb and reached their own resolutions. The Representation symbolically took the place of the banned Croatian Parliament and strengthened the authority of peasant leaders Stjepan Radić and Vladko Maček, who became the de facto leaders of the Croatian people.

See also
 6 January Dictatorship (1929)
 Zagreb Points (1932)
 Cvetković-Maček Agreement (1939)

References

Political history of Croatia
20th century in Croatia
Defunct political party alliances in Croatia
Political parties in the Kingdom of Yugoslavia
Croatian nationalist parties
Ethnic organizations based in Yugoslavia
Yugoslav Croatia
Political terminology of Croatia
Croatian irredentism